MAP Linhas Aéreas is a domestic airline based in Manaus, Brazil, founded in 2011 authorized to operate regular and non-regular charter flights within Brazil. 

According to the National Civil Aviation Agency of Brazil (ANAC), between January and December 2019 MAP had 0.1% of the domestic market share in terms of revenue passenger kilometers (RPK). making it the sixth largest domestic airline in Brazil.

History
MAP (Manaus Aerotaxi Participações S/A) Linhas Aéreas was founded in 2011 and received its authorization to operate flights on August 14, 2012.

MAP Linhas Aéreas was a sister company of Manaus Aerotáxi.

On August 14, 2019, MAP was granted 12 slots at São Paulo–Congonhas Airport and on August 21, 2019, it was announced the purchase of MAP by Voepass Linhas Aéreas. Even though part of the same group, the brand MAP continued to exist.

On June 8, 2021 Gol Linhas Aéreas announced the purchase of MAP from Voepass Linhas Aéreas. The transaction included 26 slots at São Paulo–Congonhas Airport belonging to MAP and Voepass. The Amazonian operations and aircraft of MAP were transferred to Voepass.

Destinations
MAP operated flights to the following locations until being sold to Gol Transportes Aéreos and its former flights started being operated by Voepass in July 2021:

Fleet

MAP Linhas Aéreas fleet consists of the following aircraft (as of August 2022) and are used by Voepass:

Airline affinity program
MAP Linhas Aéreas has no Frequent Flyer Program.

See also
List of airlines of Brazil

References

External links

Airlines of Brazil
Airlines established in 2011